Actias chapae or colloquially known as the 'celestial moon moth' is a moth in the family Saturniidae. It is found in Vietnam and China and potentially other countries in the region; it is a montane species recorded from 1500m and higher. It appears to be an exclusive pine feeder and has been raised on many different species of Pinus in captivity.

Subspecies
Actias chapae chapae
Actias chapae bezverkhovi Wu & Naumann, 2006 (southern Vietnam)

References

 , 1950: Aus der Biologie der chinesischen Actias Leach. (Argema chapae sp.n., A. sinensis f. virescens f.n.). Entomologische Zeitschrift 60 (6, 7): 41-45, 53-56.
 , 1995: Designation of the lectotype of Actias chapae Mell, 1950 (Lepidoptera: Saturniidae). Nachrichten des Entomologischen Vereins Apollo N.F. 16 (2/3): 309-310.

Chapae
Moths described in 1950
Moths of Asia